Duško Gojković (born 14 October 1931) is a Serbian and Yugoslav jazz trumpeter, composer, and arranger.

Biography
Gojković was born in Jajce (ex-Yugoslavia, now in Bosnia-Herzegovina). He studied at the Belgrade Music Academy from 1948 to 1953. He played trumpet in dixieland bands and joined the big band of Radio Belgrade when he was eighteen. He moved to West Germany and first recorded as a member of the Frankfurt Allstars in 1956. He spent the next four years as a member of Kurt Edelhagen's orchestra.

In these years, Gojković played with Chet Baker, Stan Getz, and Oscar Pettiford. In 1958, he performed at Newport Jazz Festival and drew attention on both sides of the Atlantic Ocean. In 1961, Gojkovic received a scholarship to attend Berklee College of Music, where he studied with Herb Pomeroy.

In 1966, Gojković recorded in Cologne his album Swinging Macedonia, produced by Eckart Rahn. The album contained original compositions inspired by the music of the Balkans. In the following years, he performed with Miles Davis, Dizzy Gillespie, Gerry Mulligan, Sonny Rollins, Duke Jordan, and Slide Hampton. He worked with the Kenny Clarke/Francy Boland Big Band from 1968–1973.

In 1986, Gojković formed another orchestra. His next albums were Soul Connection (1994), Bebop City, Balkan Blue (1997), In My Dreams (2001), Samba do Mar (2003), and Samba Tzigane (2006). In 2004, he performed on the 200th anniversary of Serbian statehood. For the occasion he performed with an all-star big band. Two years Gojković celebrated his 75th birthday with a grand concert in Belgrade, a capitol of the Republic of Serbia.

The Brandenburg Concert – Dusko Goykovich With Strings came in 2013, showcasing Gojković performing live at Germany's Brandenburger Theatre, backed by the Brandenburg Orchestra. The same year, and recorded and titled to Duško Gojković & Big Bend RTS featuring Martin Gjakonovski, Latin Haze, was released by PGP RTS in Serbia in 2014, while a year later it was issued in Germany on Enja with different cover and with one track missing.

Discography

As leader
 Swinging Macedonia (Philips (Germany), 1966; reissued on CD by Enja)
 Live at Domicile Munich (Session)/As Simple as It Is (MPS/BASF, 1970; issued by MPS, 1971)
 After Hours (Enja, 1971)
 It's About Blues Time (Ensayo, 1971; issued 1972)
 Ten to Two Blues (Ensayo, 1971)
 Slavic Mood (RCA, 1974)
 East of Montenegro (RCA, 1975; CD issue by Cosmic Sounds)
 Wunderhorn (Selected Sound, 1977)
 Trumpets & Rhythm Unit (RTB, 1979; CD reissue by Cosmic Sounds)
 Blues in the Gutter (Diskoton, 1983; CD reissue by Cosmic Sounds)
 A Day in Holland (Nilva, 1983)
 Adio-Easy Listening Music (PGP RTB, 1983)
 Snap Shot (Diskoton, 1983; CD reissue by Cosmic Sounds)
 Celebration (DIW, 1987)
 Balkan Blue (Enja, 1992; released 1997)
 Soul Connection (Enja, 1993; released 1994)
 Bebop City (Enja, 1994; released 1995)
 Balkan Connection (Enja, 1995; released 1996)
 European Dream (Paddle Wheel, 1997, released 1999)
 Round Midnight: Live At Lexington Hall (Paddle Wheel, 1998; released 1999)
 Golden Earrings (Paddle Wheel, 1998; released 1999)
 Portrait (Enja, 2002 compilation)
 In My Dreams (Enja, 2001)
 5 Horns and Rhythm (Enja, 2002)
 Samba Do Mar (Enja, 2003)
 A Handful o' Soul (Enja, 2005)
 Samba Tzigane (Enja, 2006)
 Summit Octet: Five Horns & Rhythm (B92, 2008, released 2010) 
 Tight But Loose (Organic Music, 2011) – with Scott Hamilton
 The Brandenburg Concert (Enja, 2013) – with Strings album
 Latin Haze (PGP RTS/Enja, 2014)

As sideman
With the Kenny Clarke/Francy Boland Big Band
 The Golden 8 (Blue Note, 1961)
 Swing, Waltz, Swing (Philips, 1966)
 Faces (MPS, 1968)
 Latin Kaleidoscope (MPS, 1968)
 Fellini 712 (MPS, 1969)
 All Blues (MPS, 1969)
 More Smiles (MPS, 1969)
 Off Limits (Polydor, 1970)
 November Girl  with Carmen McRae (Black Lion, 1975)

With Maynard Ferguson
 The New Sounds of Maynard Ferguson and His Orchestra (Cameo 1964)

With Joe Haider
 One for Klook (Sound Hills, 2004)

With Woody Herman
 My Kind of Broadway (Columbia, 1964)
 Live in Antibes (France's Concert, 1965; released 1988)
 Woody's Winners (Columbia, 1965)
 Jazz Hoot (Columbia, 1965; released 1974)
 Woody Live East and West (Columbia, 1965/1967)

With Dušan Prelević
 U redu, pobedio sam (RTB, 1991)

With Oscar Pettiford
 Lost Tapes: Baden-Baden 1958–1959 (Jazzhaus, 2013)

With Alvin Queen
 Ashanti (Nilva, 1981)

With Sarajevo Big Band and Sinan Alimanović 
 Najveći koncert u gradu (Mascom, 2000)

References

External links

 Official site in English

Dixieland revivalist trumpeters
Dixieland trumpeters
Serbian jazz musicians
Serbian jazz trumpeters
Serbian jazz bandleaders
Berklee College of Music alumni
1931 births
Living people
Enja Records artists
MPS Records artists
21st-century trumpeters
Kenny Clarke/Francy Boland Big Band members